San José de Fray Mamerto Esquiú or simply San José is a town in Catamarca Province, Argentina. It is the head town of the Fray Mamerto Esquiú Department. It is part of the Gran San Fernando del Valle de Catamarca urban agglomeration.

External links

 Municipal website

Populated places in Catamarca Province